Art College 1994 is a 2023 Chinese animated film directed by Liu Jian. Set on the campus of the Chinese Southern Academy of Arts in the early 1990s, featuring a group of art students caught between tradition and modernity, as love and friendships are intertwined with their artistic pursuits, ideals and ambitions. The film features the voices of Jia Zhangke, Zheng Dasheng, Xu Lei, film producer Wang Hongwei, musicians Peng Lei and Ren Ke, academic Xu Zhiyuan, and Shen Lihui. 

It is selected to compete for the Golden Bear at the 73rd Berlin International Film Festival, where it had its world premiere on 24 February 2023.

Voice cast
 Jia Zhangke
 Zheng Dasheng
 Xu Lei
 Wang Hongwei
 Peng Lei 
 Ren Ke
 Xu Zhiyuan
 Shen Lihui
 Dong Zijian
 Zhou Dongyu
 Chizi
 Papi Jiang
 Huang Bo
 Bai Ke
 Bi Gan
 Kevin Tsai

Production
Art College 1994 is the third animated film by Chinese artist and filmmaker Liu Jian. The animated film is produced by Yang Cheng, who produced Liu's previous film Have a Nice Day (2017), and backed by the production companies Nezha Bros. Pictures, Modern Sky Entertainment, and the Animation and Game Development Department of the China Academy of Art, where Liu teaches as a professor. Commenting on the film, producer Yang Cheng said, “It took director Liu Jian five years to create this film with his iconic artistic style and true sensibility,” He further said, “Both as an animated film and as an arthouse film, it’s very unique.”

The film is a 2D hand-drawn animated film produced by a team of teachers and students at the China Academy of Art. According to the academy, the film possesses “aesthetics that exhibit distinctive Chinese elements, and is a significant creative and pedagogical product of Academy's pursuit of ‘neorealistic animation'”.

Release

The film had its world premiere at the 73rd Berlin International Film Festival on 24 February 2023. Paris-based Memento International has secured global sales rights for the film.

Reception

Wendy Ide for ScreenDaily wrote in review, that the film, "evokes a specific time and a place so vividly that you can almost taste the stale cigarette smoke and cheap beer." Ide added, "But perhaps the most pertinent message is Rabbit’s claim that anything can be art, something that Liu demonstrates throughout the picture, with the beauty he finds in the banality of the everyday object: the peeling paint, the broken windows, the stag beetle’s futile attempts to scale a wall." James Mottram of South China Morning Post rated the film with 3 stars out of 5 and wrote, "Liu’s unique animation style is stunning, made more so with odd artistic flourishes such as a painting of Lili filled with babies, fish, cameras and more." Mottram added, "And for all its flaws, it’s still a one-off in the world of animation." Leslie Felperin reviewing at Berlin Festival for Hollywood Reporter called the film "Endearing, if you can take the dorm-room philosophizing." Concluding Felperin, talked about Liu's urge of using computers for expediency, and opined, "but trying to maintain a handmade vibe that fits the material, making this feel altogether like a lost graphic novel you find in a dive bar and love until the pages fall apart."

Accolades

References

External links
 
 
 Art College 1994 at Berlinale
 Art College 1994 on China Academy of Art's official YouTube channel
 

2023 animated films
2023 films
Chinese animated films
Films set in 1990
2020s Mandarin-language films